Buddy is the nickname of:

In arts and entertainment
Buddy Baker (composer) (1918–2002), American composer 
Buddy Bolden (1877–1931), American jazz cornetist
Buddy Bregman (1930–2017), American arranger and producer
Buddy Buie (1941–2015), American songwriter and record producer
Buddy Clark (1912–1949), American pop singer
Buddy DeFranco (1923–2014), American jazz clarinetist
Buddy Deppenschmidt (1936–2021), American jazz drummer
Buddy DeSylva (1895–1950), American songwriter, record executive, and film producer
Buddy Ebsen (1908–2003), American actor and dancer best known for his role in The Beverly Hillbillies
Buddy Emmons (1937–2015), American country guitarist
A. Arnold Gillespie (1899–1978), American cinema special effects artist
Buddy Greco (1926–2017), American jazz and pop singer and pianist
Buddy Guy (born 1936), American blues guitarist and singer
Buddy Hackett (1924–2003), American actor and comedian
Buddy Holly (1936–1959), American pioneering rock and roll singer, songwriter, and musician
Buddy Kaye (1918–2002), American songwriter
Buddy Lester (1915–2002), American comedian and actor
Buddy Miles (1947–2008), American rock and funk drummer
Buddy Rich (1917–1987), American jazz drummer and bandleader
Charles "Buddy" Rogers (1904–1999), American actor and jazz musician
Buddy Stewart (1922–1950), American jazz singer
Buddy Valastro (b. 1977), American celebrity chef, star of the TLC show Cake Boss

In sports
Buddy Alexander (born 1953), American college golf head coach and former amateur golfer
Buddy Allin (1944–2007), American professional golfer
Buddy Baer (1915–1986), American boxer
Buddy Baker (1941–2015), American NASCAR driver
Buddy Bell (born 1951), American Major League Baseball player and manager
Buddy Blattner (1920–2009), American Major League Baseball player, world champion table tennis doubles player and sportscaster
Buddy Boeheim (born 1999), American basketball player
Buddy Boshers (born 1988), American Major League Baseball pitcher
Buddy Burris (1923–2007), American college and National Football League player
Buddy Daye (1928–1995), Canadian boxer
Buddy Dear (1905–1989), American Major League Baseball player
Lance Franklin (born 1987), Australian rules footballer
Buddy Gardner (born 1955), American professional golfer
Yileen Gordon (born 1987), Australian rugby league footballer
Buddy Hall (born 1945), American professional pool player
Buddy Hield (born 1993), Bahamian basketball player
Buddy Howell (born 1996), American football player
Buddy Jackson (born 1989), American football player
Buddy Lively (1925–2015), American former Major League Baseball pitcher
Buddy Murphy (born 1988), ring name of Australian professional wrestler Matthew Adams
Buddy Myer (1904–1974), American Major League Baseball player
Hub Pernoll (1888–1944), American baseball pitcher
Buddy Ryan (1931–2016), American football coach

Soldiers
Lee Archer (pilot) (1919–2010), African-American World War II flying ace, member of the Tuskegee Airmen and lieutenant colonel
Charles R. Long (1923–1951), American Korean War sergeant and Medal of Honor recipient
Horace M. Thorne (1918–1944), American World War II soldier and Medal of Honor recipient

Politicians
Buddy Cianci (1941–2016), longtime mayor of Providence, Rhode Island
George Darden (born 1943), American politician
Buddy Dyer (born 1958), mayor of Orlando, Florida
Buddy Roemer (1943–2021), American former congressman, Louisiana governor and independent presidential candidate

Other
William Moore (steamship captain) (1822–1909), German-born steamship captain, businessman, miner and explorer in British Columbia and Alaska
Pat Nixon (1912–1993), wife of former President Richard M. Nixon; nickname in high school yearbook
J. C. Nicholson (born 1942), American judge

See also 

 
 
 Ferenc Puskás (1927–2006), renowned Hungarian footballer nicknamed Öcsi (Buddy)
 Bud (nickname)
 The Secret Life Of Pets

Lists of people by nickname
English masculine given names